Joseph Bonomi or Giuseppi Bonomi may mean either of a father-son pair notable in architecture and sculpture:

Joseph Bonomi the Elder (1739–1808), Italian architect
Joseph Bonomi the Younger (1796–1878), English sculptor and Egyptologist